In number theory, the prime omega functions  and  count the number of prime factors of a natural number  Thereby   (little omega) counts each distinct prime factor, whereas the related function  (big omega) counts the total number of prime factors of  honoring their multiplicity (see arithmetic function). These prime factor counting functions have many important number theoretic relations.

Properties and relations

 

If  divides  at least once we count it only once, e.g. .

If  divides   times then we count the exponents, e.g. . As usual,  means  is the exact power of  dividing .

If   then  is squarefree and related to the Möbius function by 

If  then  is a prime number.

It is known that the average order of the divisor function satisfies .

The function  is related to divisor sums over the Möbius function and the divisor function including the next sums.

 
 
 
 
 

The characteristic function of the primes can be expressed by a convolution with the 
Möbius function:

where  is the partition function,  is the Möbius function, and the triangular sequence  is expanded by

in terms of the infinite q-Pochhammer symbol and the restricted partition functions  which respectively denote the number of 's in all partitions of  into an odd (even) number of distinct parts.

Continuation to the complex plane
A continuation of  has been found, though it is not analytic everywhere. Note that the normalized  function  is used.

Average order and summatory functions

Similarly, if  is primorial then the function is as large as 
 on average order. When  is a power of 2, then  
.

are respectively computed in Hardy and Wright as  

where  is the Mertens constant and the constant  is defined by

Other sums relating the two variants of the prime omega functions include 

and

Example I: A modified summatory function

In this example we suggest a variant of the summatory functions  estimated in the above results for sufficiently large . We then prove an asymptotic formula for the growth of this modified summatory function derived from the asymptotic estimate of  provided in the formulas in the main subsection of this article above.

To be completely precise, let the odd-indexed summatory function be defined as

where  denotes Iverson bracket. Then we have that

The proof of this result follows by first observing that

Example II: Summatory functions for so-termed factorial moments of ω(n)

The computations expanded in Chapter 22.11 of Hardy and Wright provide asymptotic estimates for the summatory function

by estimating the product of these two component omega functions as

We can similarly calculate asymptotic formulas more generally for the related summatory functions over so-termed factorial moments of the function .

Dirichlet series

A known Dirichlet series involving  and the Riemann zeta function is given by 

We can also see that 

The function  is completely additive, where  is strongly additive (additive). Now we can prove a short lemma in the following form which implies exact formulas for the expansions of the Dirichlet series over both  and : 

Lemma.

Proof. We can see that 

This implies that 

wherever the corresponding series and products are convergent. In the last equation, we have used the Euler product representation of the Riemann zeta function. 

 
Liouville lambda function.

The distribution of the difference of prime omega functions 

The distribution of the distinct integer values of the differences  is regular in comparison with the semi-random properties of the component functions. For , define 

These cardinalities have a corresponding sequence of limiting densities  such that for  

 

These densities are generated by the prime products 

 

With the absolute constant , 
the densities  satisfy 

 

See also 

 Additive function
 Arithmetic function
 Erdős–Kac theorem
 Omega function (disambiguation)
 Prime number 
 Square-free integer

Notes

References

External links
 OEIS Wiki for related sequence numbers and tables
 OEIS Wiki on Prime Factors

Number theory
Prime numbers
Additive functions
Integer sequences